Willem Frederik Volkers (3 October 1899 – 4 January 1990) was a Dutch football player and coach.

Career statistics

International goals

References

External links
 VoetbalStats.nl
 AFC Ajax official profile

1899 births
1990 deaths
Dutch footballers
Netherlands international footballers
Dutch football managers
AFC Ajax players
AFC Ajax managers
AFC Ajax chairmen and investors
Footballers from Amsterdam
Association football forwards